Gerard Artigas (born 10 January 1995) is a Spanish professional footballer who plays as a striker for V.League 1 club Nam Dinh.

Career

Youth

As a youth player, he joined the youth academy of Barcelona.

Chrobry Glogow

In 2019, Artigas signed for Chrobry Glogow.

Izarra

In 2018, he signed for Izarra.

Prat

In 2020, he signed for Prat.

Persis Solo
On 5 June 2022, Artigas joined Liga 1 (Indonesia) side Persis Solo. He made his debut at President's Cup against PSS Sleman on 11 June 2022, which ended in a draw. He didn't score a single goal in the tournament.

Artigas made his Liga 1 debut against Dewa United on 25 July 2022, on which he scored his debut goal. The match itself ended with Persis defeat. Despite him scoring, he was released by Persis on 30 August 2022.

Inter Club d'Escaldes
After short stint with Persis, Artigas returned to Inter Club d'Escaldes. During his second stint with Inter, he won Andorran Supercup, beating old rival Atlètic Club d'Escaldes 2-1 in the final.

Nam Dinh
Artigas joined Nam Dinh for 2023 V.League 1 season.

Honours
Inter Club d'Escaldes
 Primera Divisió: 2020–21, 2021–22
 Supercopa Andorrana: 2022

References

External links

1995 births
Living people
Spanish footballers
Association football forwards
Liga 1 (Indonesia) players
Persis Solo players
Spanish expatriate sportspeople in Indonesia